These are the official results of the Men's javelin throw event at the 1986 European Championships in Stuttgart, West Germany, held at Neckarstadion on 26 and 27 August 1986. There were a total number of 30 competitors. The qualification mark was set at 79.50 metres.

Medalists

Schedule
All times are Central European Time (UTC+1)

Abbreviations
All results shown are in metres

Records

Qualification
Held on 26 August 1986

Final

Participation
According to an unofficial count, 30 athletes from 14 countries participated in the event.

 (1)
 (1)
 (2)
 (3)
 (3)
 (1)
 (2)
 (3)
 (1)
 (3)
 (3)
 (3)
 (3)
 (1)

See also
 1983 Men's World Championships Javelin Throw (Helsinki)
 1984 Men's Olympic Javelin Throw (Los Angeles)
 1987 Men's World Championships Javelin Throw (Rome)
 1988 Men's Olympic Javelin Throw (Seoul)

References

 Results

Javelin throw
Javelin throw at the European Athletics Championships